Velasco was a  unprotected cruiser of the Spanish Navy which fought in the Battle of Manila Bay during the Spanish–American War.

Technical characteristics
Velasco was built by the Thames Ironworks & Shipbuilding & Engineering Co. Ltd. at Leamouth, London in the United Kingdom, as the lead ship of a new class of eight Spanish unprotected cruisers. Her keel was laid in 1881. She had one rather tall funnel. She had an iron hull and was rigged as a barque. She and the second ship of the class, also built in the United Kingdom, were differently armed from and slightly faster than the final six ships of the class, all of which were built in Spain.

Operational history

When the Spanish–American War began in April 1898, Velasco was anchored in Manila Bay off the Cavite Peninsula as part of Rear Admiral Patricio Montojo y Pasaron's Pacific Squadron. In the Battle of Manila Bay, she was still anchored there when the U.S. Navy's Asiatic Squadron attacked Montojo's squadron on 1 May 1898. Her boilers were ashore being repaired. All her guns were apparently removed to the Caballo Island Battery. She did not participate in the battle although ended up sunk.

References
 Chesneau, Roger, and Eugene M. Kolesnik, Eds. Conway's All The World's Fighting Ships 1860–1905. New York, New York: Mayflower Books Inc., 1979. .
 Nofi, Albert A. The Spanish–American War, 1898. Conshohocken, Pennsylvania: Combined Books, Inc., 1996. .

External links
 Department of the Navy: Naval Historical Center: Online Library of Selected Images: Spanish Navy Ships: Velasco (Cruiser, 1881–1898)

Velasco-class cruisers
Ships built in Leamouth
1881 ships
Spanish–American War cruisers of Spain
Maritime incidents in 1898
Shipwrecks in the South China Sea
Shipwrecks of the Spanish–American War
Shipwrecks of the Philippines